Madan Ashrit Highway also known as Muglin - Narayangadh Highway is Nepal's one of the busiest international roadway link, carrying 90% of all international traffic, or about 20,000 vehicles daily.  The 36 km road connects Naryangadh and Mugling.  A 33.2 km section was being widened from 5 meters to 9–11 meters, and was finished in June 2018.
It connects to Prithvi Highway at Mugling and Mahendra Highway at Naryanghat.

References

Highways in Nepal